A non-binding referendum on nuclear power was held in Sweden on 23 March 1980. Three proposals were put to voters. The second option, the gradual phasing out of nuclear power, won a narrow plurality of the vote, receiving 39.1% of the ballots cast to 38.7% for option 3. Option 1 was the least popular, receiving only 18.9% of the votes.

The actual long term result of the nuclear power politics in Sweden after the referendum has been most similar to option 1 which did not change ownership of nuclear power plants. Some were fully private and other owned by the government, and this did not change much. High profits in hydroelectric generation were not excessively taxed. Although some of the nuclear power plants were decommissioned, the Swedish government decided to reverse the policy.

In March 2022, due to the global energy crisis, the Swedish government invited German energy company Uniper to build a nuclear power plant in Scania.

Details of the options

Option 1
 The ballot for "Linje 1" read:
"Nuclear power shall be phased out, while taking consideration of the need for electric power for the maintenance of employment and welfare. In order to, among other things, lessen the dependency on oil, and while waiting for the availability of renewable energy sources, at most 12 of the reactors shall be used, be they existing or under construction. No further expansion is to take place. The order in which the reactors will be taken out of production will be determined by security concerns."
There was no text on the reverse side of the ballot.

Option 2
 The front side of the ballot for "Linje 2" had almost identical wording to that of "Linje 1". However, on the reverse side, the following text was added:
"Energy conservation shall be pursued vigorously and stimulated further. The weakest groups in society shall be protected. Measures shall be taken to control consumption of electricity, e.g. prohibiting direct electric heating in the construction of new permanent housing.

Research and development of renewable energy sources shall be pursued under the leadership of the community [government].

Environmental and safety improving measures are to be carried out. A special safety study is to be made at each reactor. To allow insight by the citizens a special security committee with local ties is appointed at each nuclear power plant.

Production of electricity from oil and coal is to be avoided.

The community [government] shall have the main responsibility for production and distribution of electric power. Nuclear power plants and other future installations for the production of significant electric power shall be owned by the state and by the municipalities. Excessive profits from hydroelectric power generation are reduced by taxation."

The last point was controversial and the most important reason why the Moderate Party would not consider supporting "Linje 2".

Option 3
 The front side of the ballot for "Linje 3" read:
"NO to continued expansion of nuclear power.

Phasing out of the currently operating six reactors with at most ten years. A conservation plan for reduced dependency on oil is to be carried through on the basis of:
 continued and intensified energy conservation
 greatly increased development of renewable energy sources.

The operating reactors are subjected to heightened safety requirements. Non-fueled reactors will never be put into production.

Uranium mining is to be prohibited in our country."

The reverse side of the ballot read:

"If ongoing or future safety analyses demand it, immediate shutdown is to take place.
The work against nuclear proliferation and nuclear weapons shall be intensified. No fuel enrichment is permitted and the export of reactors and reactor technology is to cease.
Employment will increase through alternative energy production, more effective conservation of energy and refinement of raw materials."

Results

By county

See also
Nuclear power in Sweden

References

External links
 
 

Referendums in Sweden
1980 in Sweden
1980 referendums
Nuclear power referendums
March 1980 events in Europe
Multiple-choice referendums